Z is a 2019 Canadian horror film directed by Brandon Christensen and based on a script written by Christensen and Colin Minihan. The film stars Keegan Connor Tracy, Jett Klyne, and Sean Rogerson.

Plot
A couple is terrorized by their eight-year old son’s imaginary friend.

Cast
 Keegan Connor Tracy as Elizabeth "Beth" Parsons
 Jett Klyne as Joshua Parsons
 Sean Rogerson as Kevin Parsons
 Sara Canning as Jenna Montgomery
 Stephen McHattie as Dr. Seager
 Chandra West as Georgia
 Ali Webb as Mrs. Hirsch
 Deborah Ferguson as Alice Montgomery
 Luke Moore as Z
 Fox Rose as Daniel
 Jayson Therrien as Beth's Dad
 Sarah Munn as Young Beth
 Grace Christensen as Young Jenna

Development
Keegan Connor Tracy stated that the film "was such a huge emotional journey for me and I had to sort of sequester myself a lot to stay in that woman’s mental and emotional space".

Release
Z was released as a Shudder exclusive on May 7, 2020.

Reception

References

External links
 
 

2019 horror films
English-language Canadian films
Films about imaginary friends
2010s English-language films
Shudder (streaming service) original programming
Canadian horror films
2010s Canadian films